The Secretary of Agriculture of Iowa is an elected position in government of the U.S. state of Iowa that was created in 1923 by the extra session of the 40th General Assembly. The Secretary of Agriculture heads the Iowa Department of Agriculture and Land Stewardship, which is responsible for managing land and helping farmers in the state.

Background

Directly and indirectly, agriculture has always been a major component of Iowa's economy. However, the direct production and sale of raw agricultural products contributes only about 3.5% of Iowa's gross state product.

The indirect role of agriculture in Iowa's economy can be measured in multiple ways, but its total impact, including agriculture-affiliated business, has been measured at 16.4% in terms of value added and 24.3% in terms of total output. This is lower than the economic impact in Iowa of non-farm manufacturing, which accounts for 22.4% of total value added and 26.5% of total output.

Iowa's main agricultural outputs are hogs, corn, soybeans, oats, cattle, eggs and dairy products. Iowa is the nation's largest producer of ethanol and corn.  Major Iowa agricultural product processors include Cargill, Inc., Pioneer Hi-Bred International, Monsanto Company, Ajinomoto and Hy-Vee.

List of Secretaries of Agriculture of Iowa

References

1972 establishments in Iowa